Patricia Mazuy (born 1960) is a French film director and screenwriter. Her film Peaux de vaches was screened in the Un Certain Regard section at the 1989 Cannes Film Festival. Eleven years later her film Saint-Cyr was screened in the same section at the 2000 Cannes Film Festival.

Filmography
 La boiteuse (1984)
 Peaux de vaches (1989)
 Des taureaux et des vaches (1992)
 La finale (1999)
 Saint-Cyr (2000)
 Basse Normandie (2004)
 Sport de filles (2011)
 Paul Sanchez est revenu! (2018)
  (2022)

References

External links

1960 births
French women film directors
Living people
People from Dijon
French film directors
French women screenwriters
French screenwriters